Ain't Misbehavin' may refer to:

Music
 "Ain't Misbehavin (song), a 1929 Fats Waller standard
 [[Ain't Misbehavin' (musical)|''Ain't Misbehavin (musical)]], a 1978 musical that features the 1929 song
 Ain't Misbehavin (Clark Terry album)]], 1979
 [[Ain't Misbehavin' (Hank Jones album)|''Ain't Misbehavin (Hank Jones album)]], 1979
 [[Ain't Misbehavin' (Tokyo Blade album)|Ain't Misbehavin (Tokyo Blade album)]], 1987
 [[Ain't Misbehavin' (UFO album)|Ain't Misbehavin (UFO album)]], 1986

Film and television
 [[Ain't Misbehavin' (film)|''Ain't Misbehavin (film)]], a 1955 American musical romantic comedy
 [[Ain't Misbehavin' (TV series)|Ain't Misbehavin (TV series), a 1990s British sitcom
 ''Ain't Misbehavin, a 1997 British TV miniseries starring Jerome Flynn and Robson Green